The Cantonal and University Library of Lausanne (Bibliothèque cantonale et universitaire de Lausanne, BCU) was founded in the 16th century and became one of the most important public libraries in Switzerland.

History 
The University of Lausanne was founded in 1537; and the library collection has evolved over the centuries to meet the changing needs of the institution's seven faculties—theology, law, arts, social and political science, business and economics, science and medicine.

In 1982, the university's central administration and the Cantonal and University Library (BCU) were installed at Dorigny.

See also 
 EPFL Learning Center
 Lausanne campus
 Scriptorium Digital Library

Notes and references

External links 
   Official website
   University of Lausanne
 European Library

Academic libraries in Switzerland